Orthetrum julia, the Julia skimmer is a species of dragonfly in the family Libellulidae.

Distribution and status
It is found in Angola, Benin, Burkina Faso, Cameroon, Central African Republic, the Republic of the Congo, the Democratic Republic of the Congo, Ivory Coast, Equatorial Guinea, Ethiopia, Gabon, Gambia, Ghana, Guinea, Kenya, Liberia, Malawi, Mozambique, Namibia, Nigeria, São Tomé and Príncipe, Senegal, Sierra Leone, South Africa, Sudan, Tanzania, Togo, Uganda, Zambia, Zimbabwe, possibly Burundi, and possibly Madagascar.

Habitat
Its natural habitats are subtropical or tropical moist lowland forests, rivers, and freshwater springs.

Similar species
Orthetrum stemmale appears similar to O. julia falsum in south-eastern Africa. The important differences are in wing details shown in the figure (left). O. julia falsum (top) has dark subcostal Ax and has one row of cells in the radial planate (generally less than 10 cells doubled - summed over the radial planates of the four wings). This example shows a single doubled cell on each wing. O. stemmale (bottom) has pale subcostal Ax and usually at least ten cells doubled in total over the four wings - this example shows three doubled cells in the radial planate of the forewing. The pterostigma of O. julia falsum is generally dark, whereas that of O. stemmale is pale.

References

External links

 Orthetrum julia on African Dragonflies and Damselflies Online

Insects described in 1900
Libellulidae
Odonata of Africa
Taxonomy articles created by Polbot